Maciej Pałyszko (born January 2, 1978 in Warsaw, Mazowieckie) is a retired male hammer thrower from Poland. He set his personal best (80.89 metres) on July 13, 2003 in Bydgoszcz.

Achievements

References

1978 births
Living people
Polish male hammer throwers
Athletes (track and field) at the 2000 Summer Olympics
Olympic athletes of Poland
Athletes from Warsaw
Skra Warszawa athletes